Artur Prusak is a Polish rally driver currently competing in the FIA E-Rally Regularity Cup where he is a three-time champion, having won it in 2015, 2016 and 2020.

Biography 
In 2015, Prusak won the FIA Alternative Energies Cup on a Toyota Prius. During the season, paired with French co-driver Thierry Benchetrit, he finish in first place at the Ecorally San Marino – Città del Vaticano, at the Ecorally della Mendola and at the Hi Tech Ecomobility Rally in Athens and second place at the Eco Snow Trophy in Fiera di Primiero. The following season, Prusak successfully defended his AEC title, and in 2020 he won his third title in the now renamed E-Rally Regularity Cup.

References

External links

Date of birth missing (living people)
Living people
Polish rally drivers
FIA E-Rally Regularity Cup drivers
Year of birth missing (living people)